The men's 1500 metre freestyle was a swimming event held as part of the swimming at the 1932 Summer Olympics programme. It was the sixth appearance of the event, which was established in 1908. The competition was held from Thursday August 11, 1932, to Saturday August 13, 1932.

Fifteen swimmers from eight nations competed.

Medalists

Records
These were the standing world and Olympic records (in minutes) prior to the 1932 Summer Olympics.

In the first semi-final Kusuo Kitamura set a new Olympic record with 19:51.6 minutes. Shozo Makino bettered this record in the second semi-final with 19:38.7 minutes. In the final Kusuo Kitamura again took the Olympic record with 19:12.4 minutes.

Results

Heats

Thursday August 11, 1932: The fastest two in each heat and the fastest third-placed from across the heats advanced to the final. In the second heat Sunao Ishiharada and Boy Charlton tied for second place which allowed ten swimmers to advance to the semi-finals.

Heat 1

Heat 2

Heat 3

Heat 4

Semifinals

Friday August 12, 1932: The fastest three in each semi-final advanced to the final.

Semifinal 1

Semifinal 2

Final

Saturday August 13, 1932:

References

External links
Olympic Report
 

Swimming at the 1932 Summer Olympics
Men's events at the 1932 Summer Olympics